Jean Brunet (27 December 1822 – 23 October 1894) was a French Provençal poet.

Early life
Brunet was born on 27 December 1822 in Avignon, in Provence, France.

Career
On 21 May 1854, he co-founded the Félibrige movement with Joseph Roumanille, Frédéric Mistral, Théodore Aubanel, Alphonse Tavan, Paul Giéra and Anselme Mathieu.

He published collections of poems and sayings in Provençal. His first poems were published in the French literary journal entitled Musée des familles in 1867.

Personal life
He was married to Cécile Brunet. Stéphane Mallarmé, who was friends with the Brunets, wrote a poem entitled Sainte about her.

Death
He died on 23 October 1894 in Avignon.

References

1822 births
1894 deaths
Writers from Avignon
19th-century French poets
French male poets
20th-century French poets
19th-century French male writers
20th-century French male writers